Crème anglaise (French for "English cream"), custard sauce, pouring custard, or simply custard is a light, sweetened pouring custard used as a dessert cream or sauce. It is a mix of sugar, egg yolks, and hot milk usually flavoured with vanilla.

 can be poured over cakes or fruits as a sauce or eaten as part of desserts such as floating island. It also serves as a base ingredient for other desserts such as ice cream or crème brûlée.

It is occasionally known as "drinking custard" in the American South and served like eggnog during the Christmas season.

Imitation custard sauce, containing no egg, is often made from instant custard powders such as Bird's Custard.

See also
 List of dessert sauces

Notes

External links
 Making Crème Anglaise - video about how to make crème anglaise
 Cardamom Crème Anglaise - recipe

Custard desserts
Dessert sauces